The Immaculate Conception School for Boys (ICSB) is a private Catholic high school exclusively for boys located in Malolos, Philippines. It was established by the Most Rev. Cirilo R. Almario, Jr., Bishop of Malolos in 1989. It is situated next to the Minor Basilica of Our Lady of Immaculate Conception, the seat of the Roman Catholic Diocese of Malolos.

History

1989-2013: establishment 

The Immaculate Conception School for Boys was established and founded by the Bishop-emeritus of Malolos, Late Bishop-emeritus Cirilo Almario Jr. D.D. in 1989, with the late Mr. Rodolfo C. Bagay as its school principal. In 1934, the Holy Spirit Academy of Malolos once owned the land proper and named it Immaculada Academy that supports an exclusively for Girls school up until 1989 when Bishop Cirilo established an exclusive private boy school. The School sees around 300-400 new enrolees each school year and is one of the best-schools in Malolos giving K-12 Tertiary Education.

2013-present: ICSM elementary building fire, reconstruction, present history 

In 2013, the neighboring building of the Immaculate Conception School of Malolos whom then situated the Elementary Department until 2015 when Late Bishop Jose Oliveros D.D. established the Senior High School Department, caught on fire in the middle of the night. People crowded outside the building to watch the damage in the fire. In the same year, the fire was declared to be an exposed wiring situation. It wasn't until 2017 when the elementary building got finished, 4 years after the fire occurred. The size of the building was reduced as the present building of the ICSB branch is smaller than the original that burnt. Two segments of the building were demolished due to permanent destruction. As of today, the building stands firm and both buildings of ICSB and ICSM are now built with stone.

Leadership

The Immaculate Conception School for Boys is always headed by the Bishop of Malolos. The satellite branches of the school also operate under the presidency of the Bishop.

The Rector is Rev. Msgr. Pablo S. Legaspi, Jr., Vicar General of the Diocese of Malolos.

References

Boys' schools in the Philippines
Catholic secondary schools in the Philippines
Schools in Malolos
Educational institutions established in 1989
1989 establishments in the Philippines